Catasetum galeritum is a species of orchid found in North Brazil.

References

External links 

galeritum
Orchids of Brazil